Mark Anthony Pack (born 27 July 1970) is a British politician who has served as the president of the Liberal Democrats since 1 January 2020. After the party's leader, Jo Swinson, lost her seat in the 2019 December election, Pack served as acting leader alongside Ed Davey from 1 January 2020 to 27 August 2020, when Davey was elected as leader.

Education
Pack read History and Economics at the University of York from 1988 to 1991. He then undertook a PhD in history, studying nineteenth-century elections, initially at the University of Exeter, before transferring back to the University of York to complete it, in 1994.

Career
Pack worked as an IT administrator, before working for the Liberal Democrats from 2000 to 2009. He then worked in communications consultancy for MHP Communications, and then Teneo (at the time under the Blue Rubicon brand), from 2009 to 2019.

Pack was on the editorial board for the Journal of Liberal History. He was a visiting lecturer at City University.

While working for the Liberal Democrats, Pack was Head of Innovations, running the party's 2001 and 2005 Internet general election campaigns. He was the Campaign Manager for the Hornsey & Wood Green constituency from 1998 to 2005. Pack is a long-time Liberal Democrat blogger. He was co-editor of the blog Liberal Democrat Voice until 2013. Since 2011, he has edited Liberal Democrat Newswire, his monthly email newsletter about the party.

Pack stood to be the president of the Liberal Democrats in 2019, with his candidacy supported by MPs Layla Moran and Tom Brake, and MEP Catherine Bearder among others. The only other candidate was MP Christine Jardine. Pack was elected by 14,381 (58.6%) to 10,164 votes (41.4%) and began his term on 1 January 2020. As Jo Swinson, previously the leader of the party, had lost her seat in the December general election, the deputy leader Ed Davey and the party president acted as co-leaders until a new permanent leader could be elected. Pack thus assumed the acting co-leader role on starting his presidential term on 1 January 2020.

Pack ranked 5 out of 50 on the Top 50 Influential Lib Dems of 2020 list.

Bibliography

Books
101 Ways To Win An Election, with Edward Maxfield (2012)
Bad News: What the Headlines Don't Tell Us (2020)

Journal articles
With Darren Lilleker and Nigel Jackson, "Political Parties and Web 2.0: The Liberal Democrat Perspective", Politics, Volume 30(2), 2010, p. 105-112. 
"Obama: The marketing lessons", Journal of Direct, Data and Marketing Practice, Volume 12(1), 2010, p. 2-9. 
"The Victory Lab: Full of secrets, but can they swing an election?", Journal of Direct, Data and Marketing Practice, Volume 14(4), 2013, p. 3490353.

References

External links

1970 births
Living people
Presidents of the Liberal Democrats (UK)
Leaders of the Liberal Democrats (UK)
Alumni of the University of York
Alumni of the University of Exeter
British male writers
British bloggers